Harry Howith (1934–2014) was a Canadian poet.

History 

Born in Ontario, Harry Howith received a Bachelor of Arts and a Bachelor of Journalism from Carleton University in Ottawa.  He later became an English instructor at Centennial College, Toronto. He died in Kentville, Nova Scotia, June 21, 2014.

Bibliography

Burglar Tools. Ottawa: Bytown, 1963. 
Two Longer Poems (with William Hawkins). Toronto: Patrician, 1965. 
Total War. Toronto: Contact, 1966.
Fragments of the Dance. Toronto: Village Book Store, 1969. 
The Stately Homes of Westmount. Montreal: DC, 1973.
Multiple Choices:  New and Selected Poems, 1961-1976. Oakville: Mosaic Press, 1976.

References

20th-century Canadian poets
Canadian male poets
1934 births
Carleton University alumni
2014 deaths
20th-century Canadian male writers